Carlo Rigotti (10 February 1906 – 5 September 1983) was an Italian football player and manager who played as a defender.

Playing career
Over the course of his career, Rigotti played for three Serie A clubs; he started his career with hometown side Triestina, then going on to play for Milan, where he served as the team's captain, and Novara.

Managerial career
After retiring from playing, Rigotti became a manager at clubs in Italy and Switzerland.

References

1906 births
1983 deaths
Footballers from Trieste
People from Austrian Littoral
Italian footballers
Association football defenders
U.S. Triestina Calcio 1918 players
A.C. Milan players
Novara F.C. players
Serie A players
Italian football managers
A.C.R. Messina managers
Palermo F.C. managers
Cagliari Calcio managers
Parma Calcio 1913 managers
Atalanta B.C. managers
FC Chiasso managers